Vocational technical school may refer to:

Vocational-technical school, principally North American
Professional technical school, principally Eastern European and Eurasian

See also
 Vocational school
 Technical school